Governmental impact on science during World War II shows how public administration worked towards technological development that ended up providing many advantages to the armed forces, economies, and societies during their wartime strategies.

Pre-war scientific research
By implementing the notion that something needs to be done, political leaders influence scientists. For example, when discussing the development of weapons in order to protect the country, no urgency would arise if emphasis was not placed on the word ‘need.’ Urgency applies pressure on the scientists which leads to stress and paranoia. With these aspects bestowed upon a person, competition to succeed before someone else has, more often than not, proven to be the answer. This relieves stress and makes both the person doing the work and the government, who now has what they wanted, happy… a cruel psychological mind game played by the government.

Political-scientific relationship
With the scientific communities largely dependent on government funding, intrigues by individuals in the bureaucracies, and removal of freedoms due to the wartime environment, and virtual nationalization of industrial research and development for the war effort governments influences on science escalated substantially during times of war.

Because the scientists were the personnel required to aid war effort of various belligerents, they lost both scientific and personal freedoms. Since they were too busy developing technologies for the military, they had little, if any, time to work on their own research. Along with that, much time was needed for research, resulting in increasing disassociation with their families.

Financing wartime science
Money is an important strategical tool. That is why government funding was, and still is today, a way for nations to influence their respective scientists. With funding, the opportunity to expand research becomes present. Since more enhanced equipment can be harnessed and the most qualified men are at hand to operate it, more productive results come forth. In 1936, the Four Year Plan for rearmament and autarky, a plan assembled after the Treaty of Versailles to help modernize the German military, put in large amounts of money and resources in new, science-based technologies. Moreover, aerodynamic researchers in Germany received generous funding to construct wind tunnels and mathematically design aircraft, missiles, and torpedoes. Since these technologies were developed with the support of government funding, it is discernible that many scientists and scientific programs saw this as beneficial for their nation’s military and overall war effort.

Manhattan Project

The most often cited example of government impact on science is the development of the atomic bomb under the auspices of the Office of Scientific Research and Development that proved the United States the option to not conduct the assault on Japan, and end the war earlier. 
The result of scientific skills deficiency, decisions of political leaders had no other choice but to seek the assistance of their countries most knowledgeable, scientists. Though nations from all over the globe have their own range of scientists, physicists and chemists were the primary source for help during World War II. These men were the individuals primarily responsible for the development of innovative technology, such as the atomic bomb, during the war. Without these developments, the war would have been stuck in first gear, devoid of continuity.

The quest for the atomic bomb was steadily growing stronger due to the new scientific developments coming about. In 1922, just four years after World War I, a man by the name of Francis William Aston made an intriguing statement. Aston, a Nobel Laureate in chemistry, claimed that should atomic energy ever be released in practical form, “the human race will have at its command powers beyond the dreams of science fiction.” This stimulated the minds of many political leaders. It seemed as though power would substantially increase as a result of the creation and possession of this so-called ‘weapon of mass-destruction’.  Thus the race to build an atomic bomb quickly commenced. Many scientists from all over the world were working day and night to develop something that could only be described as the answer to ending the war.

References

Sources
 Walter E. Grunden, Mark Walker, and Masakatsu Yamazaki, “Wartime Nuclear Weapons Research in Germany and Japan,” in Politics and Science in Wartime, ed. Carola Sachse and Mark Walker (Washington D.C: Georgetown University, 2005
 Guy Hartcup, The Effect of Science on the Second World War (New York, New York: St. Martin’s Press Inc., 2000

Science and technology during World War II